Karl Viktor Torsten Sandelin (28 September 1887 – 8 May 1950) was a Finnish Olympic bronze medalist.

Sport 

He won the Finnish national championship in team gymnastics as a member of Ylioppilasvoimistelijat in 1909.

Career 

He completed his matriculation exam in Gamlakarleby Swedish Coeducational Gymnasium in 1907, and graduated as a Doctor of Medicine and Surgery from the University of Helsinki in 1916.

He began working as physician in 1915, and as a surgeon in 1917. He was the chairman of the Finska Läkaresällskapet, the Swedish-speaking Finnish Society of Medicine, in 1939.

During the Second World War, he served at the Tilkka military hospital. He reached the rank of major (Med.) in 1941.

He received the Cross of Liberty, 2nd Class in 1942.

Family 

His parents were rural dean Frans Viktor Sandelin and Emma Josefina Durchman. He married Aina Emilia Gylling, the daughter of senator Oscar Fredrik Wilhelm Gylling, in 1915. They had three children:
 Lars Viktor (1916–)
 Hedvig Elisabet (1919–)
 Clara Birgitta (1923–)
He and his wife are buried at the Hietaniemi Cemetery.

Eino Sandelin, who won bronze in the 1912 games, was his brother.

References 

1887 births
1950 deaths
Finnish male artistic gymnasts
Gymnasts at the 1908 Summer Olympics
Sailors at the 1912 Summer Olympics – 6 Metre
Olympic gymnasts of Finland
Olympic bronze medalists for Finland
Olympic medalists in gymnastics
Finnish male sailors (sport)
Olympic sailors of Finland
Medalists at the 1908 Summer Olympics
20th-century Finnish people